Kowloon Technical School is a technical secondary school founded by the Hong Kong Government in Sham Shui Po, Kowloon, Hong Kong near Cheung Sha Wan station. The school motto is Thorough (貫徹始終).

Structure 
The school is run as a government technical secondary school, emphasizing on Whole Person Education (全人教育). In addition to the typical secondary school curriculum, KTS enriches their students with a wide range of subjects including technical, commerce, civil education, and information technology. The list of elective subjects includes literature, science, social science, informational technology, and commerce. In the 2005-06 academic year, the school has a total of 29 classes. There are 5 classes each from Form 1 - 5 (7th - 11th grade), and 2 classes each from Form 6 - 7 (12th - 13th grade).

Features 
Kowloon Technical School provides their students with a strong curriculum in science and technology. Together with the traditional science and technology education, students can learn advanced subjects ranging from information technology, graphic communications, to electronics.

General personal development is another area of emphasis. Students develop their skills and abilities through the study of a wide range of subjects including physical education, music, arts, civic education, general studies, etc.

History 
Originally called Sham Shui Po Technical School, the school was founded on 11 September 1961. In 1964, it merged with Fuk Wah Secondary Modern School (福華街實用中學) and was renamed as Kowloon Technical School. As a result of the merger, the school became the largest secondary school in Hong Kong at the time. In the late 1960s and 1970s, Kowloon Technical School had more than 1900 students with 51 classes. However, due to rapid development of other areas in Kowloon, families have started to move to new areas away from Sham Shui Po. The student population has gradually reduced to around 1100.

In 1997, the Review of Prevocational and Secondary Technical Education proposed that technical schools change their name by removing the labelling terms. Kowloon Technical School was invited to change their name to Kowloon Government Secondary School (九龍官立中學). However, due to the strong objections from the school administration, the original name of the school was preserved.

In 1998, the teaching language was changed from English to Chinese. In 1999, the School Management Committee of Government Schools was founded.

Notable alumni 
 Vincent Cheng – HSBC Asia Pacific President
 Ambrose Lee – ex-HKSAR Secretary for Security Bureau
 Albert Cheng – LegCo member
 Ka-Ki Kwok – LegCo member
 Ming-Yum Ng – former LegCo member (deceased)
 Anthony Wong Yiu-ming – singer
 Edward Yiu – LegCo member

See also 
 Education in Hong Kong
 Lists of schools in Hong Kong

External links 
 

Government schools in Hong Kong
Sham Shui Po
Secondary schools in Hong Kong
Educational institutions established in 1961
1961 establishments in Hong Kong